Gail Glasgow (born April 24, 1951) is an American former professional tennis player. She also competed under her maiden name Gail Hansen and briefly as Gail Elliott.

Glasgow grew up in Palo Alto, California and was one of the country's top junior players in the late 1960s.

During the 1970s she played on the professional tour, with main draw appearances at Wimbledon and the US Open. She reached the third round of the 1970 Wimbledon Championships. In 1975, partnering Betty Ann Stuart, she was a doubles finalist of a WTA Tour tournament in Mission Viejo, losing the match to Chris Evert and Martina Navratilova.

WTA Tour finals

Doubles: 1 (0-1)

References

External links
 
 
  (duplicate)

1951 births
Living people
American female tennis players
Tennis people from California
Sportspeople from Palo Alto, California
21st-century American women